Beura-Cardezza is a comune (municipality) in the Province of Verbano-Cusio-Ossola in the Italian region Piedmont, located about  northeast of Turin and about  northwest of Verbania.

Beura-Cardezza borders the following municipalities: Domodossola, Pallanzeno, Premosello-Chiovenda, Trontano, Villadossola, Vogogna. Its territory is included in the National Park of Val Grande.

References

Cities and towns in Piedmont